Richard Lawson may refer to:

 Richard Lawson (actor) (born 1947), American actor
 Richard Lawson (British Army officer) (born 1927), served as General Officer Commanding in Northern Ireland
 Richard Lawson (Green politician) (born 1946), environmentalist and politician in England
 Richard Lawson (rugby union) (born 1986), South African rugby union player
 Richard Lawson (speedway rider) (born 1986), British speedway rider
 Richard Lawson (activist), far right activist in the United Kingdom
 Richard Lawson (professor) (1875–1971), New Zealand teacher
 Richard Lawson (writer), American novelist and culture critic
 Richard L. Lawson (1929–2020), United States Air Force general
 Richard Lawson of High Riggs (died 1507), three times Lord Provost of Edinburgh
 Rick Lawson (born 1973), singer
 Ricky Lawson (1954–2013), drummer and composer